Oencia is a village and municipality located in the region of El Bierzo (province of León, Castile and León, Spain) . According to the 2004 census (INE), the municipality has a population of 531 inhabitants.

It is one of Galician speaking councils of Castilla y León

References

Municipalities in El Bierzo